A Máscara is a Portuguese reality singing competition television series based on the Masked Singer franchise which originated from the South Korean version of the show King of Mask Singer. It premiered on SIC on 1 January 2020.

Series overview

Season 1

Contestants
The first season premiered on 1 January 2020 and ended on 23 February of the same year.

Episode 1 (1 January)

Episode 2 (5 January)

Episode 3 ( 11 & 12 January)

Episode 4 ( 18 & 19 January)

Episode 5 ( 25 & 26 January)
 Guest performance: Camaleão (António Sala) sings "20 Anos" by José Cid

Episode 6 ( 1 & 2 February)
 Guest performance: Camaleão (Ágata) sings "Cheguei" by Ludmilla

Episode 7 (8 & 9 February)
 Guest performance: Camaleão (Nelson Évora) sings "I Got You (I Feel Good)" by James Brown

Episode 8 ( 15 & 16 February)
 Guest performance: Camaleão (Madjer) sings "Dizer Que Não" by Dengaz

Episode 9 ( 23 & 24 February)

Round One

Round Two
 Guest performance: Camaleão (Roberto Medina) sings "I Don't Care" by Ed Sheeran and Justin Bieber

Round Three

Season 2

Contestants

Episode 1 (1 January)

Episode 2 (2 January)

Episode 3 (3 January)
 Guest Performance: Dinossauro sings "O mio babbino caro" from Gianni Schicchi

Episode 4 (9 & 10 January)
 Guest performance: Camaleão (Cuca Roseta) sings "Can't Help Falling in Love" by Elvis Presley

Episode 5 (16 & 17 January)
 Guest performance: Camaleão (Emanuel) sings "My Way" by Frank Sinatra

Episode 6 (30 & 31 January)
 Guest performance: Camaleão (Vitor Kley) sings "I'm a Believer" by Smash Mouth

Episode 7 (6 & 7 February)
 Guest performance: Camaleão (Cláudia Vieira) sings "Trevo" by Anavitória

Episode 8 (14 February)

Episode 9 (21 February)

Episode 10 (28 February & 7 March)

Round One

Round Two

Round Three

Round Four

Season 3

Contestants

Episode 1 & 2 (18 & 19 December)
 Guest performance: Camaleão (Luciana Abreu) sings "Bohemian Rhapsody" by Queen

 Guest performance: Camaleão (Carlos Ribeiro) sings "Baile de Verão" by José Malhoa
 Guest performance: Popota (Sofia Arruda) sings "Hot n Cold" by Katy Perry

Episode 3 (24 & 25 December)
 Guest performance: Camaleão (Romana) sings "Rise Up" by Andra Day

Episode 4 (26 December)
 Guest performance: Camaleão (Carlos Alberto Vidal) sings "Yesterday" by The Beatles

Episode 5 (1 & 2 January)
 Guest performance: Camaleão (Rebeca) sings "O Pastor" by Madredeus

Episode 6 (8 & 15 January)

Episode 7 (22 January)

Episode 8 (5 February)

Episode 9 (12 & 19 February)

Round One
 Group performance: "On the Floor" by Jennifer Lopez ft. Pitbull

Round Two

Round Three

New Year's Special (2021)

References

External links

2020 Portuguese television series debuts
2020s Portuguese television series
Portuguese-language television shows
Portuguese television series based on South Korean television series
Sociedade Independente de Comunicação original programming
Masked Singer